The 2015 U-18 Baseball World Cup was an international baseball tournament held by IBAF. The 2015 edition was held in Osaka, Japan from August 28, 2015 to September 6, 2015.

Format
First Round: The twelve participating nations were drawn into two groups of 6, in which single round robin will occur. The top 3 nations from each group advances to the Second Round, while the bottom 3 nations from each group advance to the Consolation Round.

Consolation Round: The 6 nations in this round play one game against the teams they have not played yet. (example: The 4th placed team from Group A will play the bottom three teams from Group B)

Second Round: The format in the Second Round is similar to that of the Consolation Round. Each team plays the top three teams from the opposing group. (example: The 1st placed team from Group B will play the top three teams from Group A) The standings for this round will include the 2 games played against the 2 other Second Round qualifiers from the team's First Round group, and the 3 games played in the Second Round, for a total of 5 games. The 3rd and 4th-place finishers advance to the Bronze Medal Game, and the 1st and 2nd-place finishers advance to the Gold Medal Game.

Finals: The Finals consist of the Bronze Medal Game, contested by the 3rd and 4th-place finishers, and the Gold Medal Game, contested by the 1st and 2nd-place finishers.

Medalists

Teams
The following 12 teams qualified for the tournament. The number shown in parenthesis is the country's position in the IBAF World Rankings going into the competition.

 
 Chinese Taipei is the official IBAF designation for the team representing the state officially referred to as the Republic of China, more commonly known as Taiwan. (See also political status of Taiwan for details.)

First round

Group A

|}

Group B

|}
1Game suspended and completed on September 2

Super round

|}

Consolation round

|}
1Game suspended and completed on September 4

Finals

Third place game

|}

Championship

|}
1The game was originally scheduled to begin at 18:10, but was delayed by rain.

References
Official website 

U-18 Baseball World Cup
U-18 Baseball World Cup